The Government of the Republic of Estonia (Estonian: Vabariigi Valitsus) is the cabinet of Estonia. Under the Constitution, it exercises executive power pursuant to the Constitution and laws of Estonia.

The cabinet carries out the country's domestic and foreign policy, shaped by parliament (Riigikogu); it directs and co-ordinates the work of government institutions and bears full responsibility for everything occurring within the authority of executive power. The government, headed by the Prime Minister, thus represents the political leadership of the country and makes decisions in the name of the whole executive power.

The following duties are attributed to the cabinet by the Constitution of Estonia:

 executes the domestic and foreign policies of the state;
 directs and co-ordinates the activities of government agencies;
 administers the implementation of laws, resolutions of the Riigikogu (Parliament), and legislation of the President of the Republic of Estonia;
 introduces bills, and submits international treaties to the Riigikogu for ratification and denunciation;
 prepares the draft of the state budget and submits it to the Riigikogu, administers the implementation of the state budget and presents a report on the implementation of the state budget to the Riigikogu;
 issues regulations and orders on the basis of and for the implementation of law;
 manages relations with other states;
 performs other duties which the Constitution and the laws vest in the Government of the Republic.

Unlike other cabinets in most other parliamentary regimes, the Government is both the de jure and de facto executive authority in Estonia. In most other parliamentary regimes, the head of state is usually the nominal chief executive, though bound by convention to act on the advice of the cabinet. In Estonia, however, the Constitution explicitly vests executive authority in the Government, not the President.

Current cabinet

The current cabinet was approved by the Riigikogu on  15 July 2022.

The coalition agreed on 14 ministers in addition to the prime minister with five each for Reform, Isamaa and the Social Democrats.

Previous cabinets

Estonian Provisional Government

Constituent cabinets

Riigikogu cabinets

Presidents cabinet

Cabinet-in exile

Restored Estonia

References

Sources
 Estonica : State : Government:
 Previous cabinets

External links
 The Government of the Republic of Estonia

 
Cabinet
Estonia, Government of
European governments